The city of Jacksonville, Florida operates the largest urban park system in the United States, providing facilities and services at more than 337 locations on more than  located throughout the city. 
In addition to municipal parks, there are ten state parks, five national facilities, and several other gardens and arboretums in the area.

Parks
This is a list of public parks in and around Jacksonville, Florida.

Municipal

103rd Street Sports Complex
9A/Baymeadows Regional Park
Adams Park
Adolph Wurn Park
Alberts Field
Alejandro Garces Camp Tomahawk Park
Alexandria Oaks Park
Alimacani Boat Ramp
Alimacani Elementary School Park
Alimacani Park and Boat Ramp
Andrew Jackson Pool
Angelina Danese Park
A. Philip Randolph Heritage Park
Archie Dickinson Park
Argyle Forest Park
Arlington Lions Club Park
Arlington Road Boat Ramp
Arlingwood Park
Atlantic Beach Elementary
Atlantic Highlands Park
Baker Point
Baker Skinner Park
Baldwin Middle/Senior High School
Balis Park
Barney Browning Park
Bay and Broad Pocket Park
Beach and Peach Urban Park
Beach Blvd. Boat Ramp
Beachwood Center and Park
Bee Street Park
Belmonte Park
Belvedere Park 1 and 2
Bent Creek Golf Course of Jacksonville
Bert Maxwell Boat Ramp
Bethesda Park
Bettes Park
Betz Tiger Point Preserve
Beverly Hills Park & Lewis Cobb Community Center
Big Pottsburg Creek Preserve
Big Talbot Island State Park
Bishop Circle Park
Bishopswood Park
Black Hammock Island Park
Blue Cypress Park, Community Center & Golf Course
Bob Hayes Sports Complex and Legends Center
Bogey Creek Preserve
Boone Park
Brackridge Park
Brannan Field Park
Brentwood Golf Course
Brooklyn Park
Brookview Elementary School Park
Brown L. Whatley Memorial Park
Bruce Park
Buck Park
Bulls Bay Preserve
Burnett Park
Buster Ford Checkerboard Park
Caleb Park
Cameron Park
Camp Milton Historic Preserve
Cancer Survivors Park
Cardinal Park
Carrol Road Park
Carvill Park
Castaway Island Preserve
Catherine Hester McNair Park
Cecil Field
Cecil Field Greenway AKA Cecil Field Conservation Corridor
Cecil Recreation Complex
Cedar Point Boat Ramp
Cedar Point Preserve
Cemetery Park
Cesery Park
Chapelgate Park
Charles Boobie Clark Park and Pool
Charles Reese Memorial Park
Cherry Street Park
Chets Creek Elementary
Chuck Rogers Park renamed Rogers Park in 2021
Cisco Gardens Park
Clanzel T. Brown Park
Colonial Manor Lake Park
Columbus Park
Concord Park
Confederate Park, renamed Springfield Park in 2020
Corkscrew Park
Cortez Park
County Dock
Crabtree Park
Cradle Creek Preserve
Criswell Park
Crown Point Elementary
Crystal Springs Elementary
Crystal Springs Road Park & Julian Barrs Community Center
Cuba Hunter Park
Curtis Lee Johnson Marina Boat Ramp
Dames Point Park and El Faro Memorial
David Wayne Pack Park
Deerwood Rotary Childrens Park
Desoto Park
Dinsmore Boat Ramp
Dinsmore Park and Community Center
Dinsmore Playground
Drew Park
Dutton Island Preserve
Earl Johnson Memorial Park
Eartha H. Napoleon Park
Ed Austin Regional Park
Edgewood Park 1,2,3
Edwards Park
Ed White School Pool
El Faro Memorial At Dames Point Park
Elizabeth "Betty" Wolfe Park formerly Pickwick Park
Elizabeth R. Powell Park
Emmett Reed Park and Community Center
Englewood High School Pool
Eugene M. Glover Playground
Exchange Club Island
FEC Park renamed Alexandria Oaks Park
Fishweir Park
Fletcher High School Pool
Fletcher Morgan Park
Fletcher Park
Florida C. Dwight Memorial Playground
Flossie Brunson Eastside Park
Flynn Park renamed Walter Anderson Memorial Park in 2019
Forestry Tower Park
Forestview Park
Forrest High School Pool renamed Westside High School Pool in 2019
Fort Caroline Club
Fort Family Regional Park formerly 9A/Baymeadows Regional Park
Fouraker Park
Freedom Park
Friendship Fountain formerly Friendship Park
Fulton Road Landing
G.E.N.A. Park
Gamewell Tot Lot
Garden City Elementary School Park
Garden City Park
Genovar Park
Gerrie`s Park
Glen Myra Park
Glynlea Park
Golf Club of Jacksonville renamed Bent Creek Golf Course of Jacksonville
Goodbys Creek Preserve
Goodbys Lake Boat Ramp renamed John T. Lowe Boat Ramp at Goodbys Creek
Granada Park
Greenland Park
Greenridge Road Park
Greenscape Celebration Park
Grove Park
Grunthal Park
Half Moon Island Preserve and Boat Ramp
Hammond Park
Hanna Park
Harborview Boat Ramp
Helen Cooper Floyd Park "Little Jetties"
Hemming Plaza renamed James Weldon Johnson Park in 2020
Henry J. Klutho Park
Henry L. Brown Kooker Park
Henry T. Jones Community Center
Henry T. Jones Park
Highlands Middle School Pool
Historic Kings Road Park
Holiday Hill Elementary School Park
Holiday Road Park
Hollybrook Park
Hollywood Park
Home Gardens Park
Hood Landing Boat Rampecr
Huffman Boulevard Park
Huguenot Memorial Park
Huguenot Park
Huntington Forest
Hyde Grove Elementary
Intracoastal Boat Ramp
Isle of Palms Park
Ivey Road Park
Jacksonville-Baldwin Rail Trail
J. Gardner Nip Sams Memorial Park
J. S. Johnson Park
Jacksonville-Baldwin Rail Trail
[https://www.coj.net/Departments/Parks-and-Recreation/Recreation-and-Community-Programming/Parks/Jacksonville-Beach-Golf-Course
 Jacksonville Beach Golf Course]
Jacksonville Beach Pier
Jacksonville Heights Elementary School Park
Jacksonville Riverwalks
Jacksonville Zoo Boat Dock
James and Downing Park
James Fields Park
James Weldon Johnson Park
James P. Small Park
James Weldon Johnson Park formerly Hemming Plaza
Jammes Road Park
Jasmine Park
J.E.B. Stuart School Park renamed Westside Middle School Park in 2021.
Jerusalem and White
Jesse  B. Smith Memorial Plaza
Jessie Ball DuPont Park
Jim King Park and Boat Ramp at Sisters Creek
Jim Rink Park
Jim Wingate  Preserve
Joe Carlucci Sisters Creek Park and Boat Ramp
Joe Davis Memorial Park
Joe James Center
John D. Liverman Park
John Murray Forbes Park
John N. McPherson Park
John Stockton Elementary School Park
Johnnie W. Walker Park & Community Center
Joseph Lee Center
Joseph Stilwell Middle School Park
J.S. Johnson Park
Julington Durbin Creek Preserve
Julius Guinyard Park and Pool
Justina Road Elementary Park
Kathryn Abbey Hanna Park
Kings Road Historic Preserve -- Thomas Creek Wildlife Properties
Klutho Park
Kona Skatepark
Lake Lucina Elementary Park
Lake Shore Middle School Pool
Lakeside Park I and II
Landon Park
Lannie Road Park
Largo Well Park
Lem Merrett Park
Leonard Abess Park
Liberty Park
Lighthouse Marine Boat Ramp
Lillian Saunders Center
Lillian S. Davin Park
Little Talbot Island State Park
Long Branch Park
Lonnie C. Miller Sr. Regional Park
Lonnie Wurn Boat Ramp
Loretto Nature Center
Losco Regional Park
Lovelace Park
Lynn Park
Main Street Park
Mallison Park and Center
Mandarin High School Pool
Mandarin South Library Park
Manson Bull Felder Park
Marion Park
Marjenhoff Park
Martin Luther King Elementary
Mary Lena Gibbs Park
Maxville Park
May Mann Jennings Park
Mayport Waterfront Park
McCoys Creek Boulevard Park
McCue Park & Boat Ramp
McGirts Creek Park
McGirts Creek Park Expansion
Melvin Park
Memorial Park
Metropolitan Park
Michael B Scanlon Mayport Boat Ramp
Mickey King Park
Mitchell Community Center and Park 
Modesky-Park Modesky Park
Monticello Wildlands
Murray Drive Playground
Murray Hill Art Center at Herbert Bayer Park
Murray Hill Four Corners Park
Murray Hill Playground
Myrtle Avenue Park
Nathan Krestul Park
Native Parks 1 and 2
New Berlin Boat Ramp
Norman Studios
Normandy Boulevard Sports Complex
Normandy Center
Normandy Park
Northbank Riverwalk Artist Square
Northbank Riverwalk
North Shore Park
Norwood Park
Oak Harbor Boat Ramp
Oak Hill Elementary Park
Oakland Park
Oceanway Community Center, Park and Pool
Ortega Hills Park
Ortega Hills Playground
Our Community Club Park
Pablo Creek Preserve
Palmer Terrace
Palmetto Leaves Regional Park
Palms Fish Camp
Panama Park
Parkwood Heights Elementary Park
Patton Park
Paxon High School
Peace Memorial Rose Garden Park
Pickwick Park renamed Elizabeth "Betty" Wolfe Park in 2011
Pine Forest Elementary School Park
Pope Duval Park
Powers Park
Rail Trail Buffer Properties
Raines High School
Ray Greene Park
Raymond E. Davis Park
Reddie Point Preserve
Reed Island
Ribault High School Pool
Ribault River Preserve
Ribault River Preserve Expansion
Ribault Scenic Drive Park
Ringhaver Park
Ritz Park
Riverfront Park
River Oaks Park
Riverside High School Pool
Riverside Park
Riverview Park
Robert F. Kennedy Park and Community Center
Rogers Park formerly Chuck Rogers Park
Rolliston Park
Rondette Park
Ronnie Van Zant Memorial Park
Royal Terrace
Russell Bill Cook Jr. Park formerly Jones Street Park
Ryder Park
S. A. Hull Elementary School Park
Sal Taylor Creek Preserve
San Jose Acre  Park
San Jose Elementary School Park
San Mateo Elementary Park
San Mateo Little League
San Mateo Neighborhood Park
San Pablo Elementary Playground
Sandalwood High School Pool
Saratoga Lake Park
Scott Park
Seaton Creek Historic Preserve
Seminole Park
Sidney J. Gefen Riverwalk Park
Signet Park
Simonds-Johnson Park
Singleton Park
S-Line Rail Trail
Southbank Riverwalk
Southside Estates Elementary School Park
Southside Park
Springfield Park originally Confederate Park
Springfield Playground originally Confederate Playground
St. Johns Marina
St. Johns Park
St. Nicholas Playground
St. Nicholas Train Station Park
Stinson Park
Stockton Park
Stone Park
Sunny Acres
Sweetwater Playground
T. K. Stokes Boat Ramp
Tallulah Park
Tara Woods Park
Taye Brown Regional Park 
Terrace Park
Terry Parker Pool and Park
Thebaut Sisters Landing
Thomas Creek Preserve & Fish Camp
Thomas Jefferson Elementary
Thomas Jefferson Park
Tideviews Preserve
Tidewater Acres Park
Tillie K. Fowler Regional Park
Timucuan Ecological and Historic Preserve
Timucuan Elementary
Timuquana Park
Tom Marshall Park
Tommy Hazouri Sr. Park
Touchton Road Park
Treaty Oak in Jessie Ball duPont Park
Tree Hill Nature Center
Trout River Pier
Venetia Elementary School Park
Verona Park
Veterans Memorial Wall
Victoria Park
Victory Park
Walter Anderson Memorial Park formerly Flynn Park
Walter Jones Historical Park
Warren W. Schell Jr. Memorial Park
Warrington Park
Water & Broad St. Pocket Park
Wayne B. Stevens Boat Ramp
Wesconnett Elementary School Park
Wesconnett Playground
Westbrook Center and Park
Westridge Park
Westside High School Pool
Westside Middle School Park
Westside Park
Westwood Park
Wheat Road Park
Whitehouse Park
Wigmore Park
Wiley Road Playground
William F. Sheffield Regional Park
Willowbranch Park
Willowbranch Rose Garden Park
Windsor Place Park
Windy Hill Center
Windy Hill Elementary Park
Wolfson High School Park and Pool
Woodstock Park & Edith B. Ford Community Center
Yacht Basin Park
Yancey Park
Yellow Water Trailhead
Yerkes Park
Young Men's And Young Women's Leadership Academy Pool
Zeta Phi Beta Park

State

Amelia Island State Park
Anastasia State Park
Big Talbot Island State Park
Fort Clinch State Park
Fort George Island Cultural State Park
George Crady Bridge Fishing Pier State Park
Jennings State Forest
Little Talbot Island State Park
Olustee Battlefield Historic State Park
Pumpkin Hill Creek Preserve State Park
Yellow Bluff Fort Historic State Park

Federal
Castillo de San Marcos National Monument
Cumberland Island National Seashore
Fort Caroline National Memorial
Fort Matanzas National Monument
Jacksonville National Cemetery
Timucuan Ecological and Historic Preserve
Kingsley Plantation

Private
Cummer Museum of Art and Gardens 
Jacksonville Arboretum & Gardens
Jacksonville Zoo and Gardens
Palm and Cycad Arboretum

References

External links 

 Jacksonville City Parks

Geography of Jacksonville, Florida
Jacksonville
 
Jacksonville, Florida-related lists